Jordan Willis (born February 28, 1975) is a Canadian former professional ice hockey goaltender who played in one National Hockey League game for the Dallas Stars during the 1995–96 NHL season. He also played for the Nottingham Panthers between 1999 and 2000.

See also
List of players who played only one game in the NHL

External links

References 

1975 births
Baton Rouge Kingfish players
Canadian ice hockey goaltenders
Canadian expatriate ice hockey players in England
Dallas Stars draft picks
Dallas Stars players
Dayton Bombers players
Ice hockey people from Ontario
Living people
London Knights players
Kalamazoo Wings (1974–2000) players
Nottingham Panthers players
People from Bruce County
Roanoke Express players